Thomas Nelson Doyle (born May 1, 1996) is an American professional baseball pitcher in the Colorado Rockies organization.

Amateur career
Doyle attended Flint Hill School in Oakton, Virginia. He was drafted by the Washington Nationals in the 35th round of the 2014 Major League Baseball draft, but did not sign and played college baseball at the University of Virginia. In 2015, he briefly played collegiate summer baseball with the Orleans Firebirds of the Cape Cod Baseball League. He was drafted by the Colorado Rockies in the second round of the 2017 Major League Baseball draft.

Professional career
Doyle made his professional debut with the Grand Junction Rockies. He pitched 2018 with the Asheville Tourists and 2019 with the Lancaster JetHawks. Doyle was invited to Spring Training by the Rockies in 2020.

Doyle was promoted to the major leagues by the Rockies on September 23, 2020. He made his major league debut that night against the San Francisco Giants.

On October 21, 2021, Doyle was outrighted off of the 40-man roster.

References

External links

1996 births
Living people
People from Vienna, Virginia
Baseball players from Virginia
Major League Baseball pitchers
Colorado Rockies players
Virginia Cavaliers baseball players
Orleans Firebirds players
Grand Junction Rockies players
Asheville Tourists players
Lancaster JetHawks players